Crossosperma is a genus of shrubs in the family Rutaceae.  The genus is  endemic to New Caledonia in the Pacific and contains two species. Its closest relative is the Australian Acradenia.

References

Endemic flora of New Caledonia
Zanthoxyloideae
Zanthoxyloideae genera